Mauchline railway station was a railway station serving the town of Mauchline, East Ayrshire, Scotland. The station was originally part of the Glasgow, Paisley, Kilmarnock and Ayr Railway.

History
The station opened on 9 August 1848. It was renamed Mauchline for Catrine by 1887, and renamed back to Mauchline in 1903. The station closed to passengers on 6 December 1965.

Today this line is still open as part of the Glasgow South Western Line.

The Garrochburn Goods Depot lay a few miles to the north and until circa 1926 a Mossgiel Tunnel Platform was located just to the north of the tunnel mouth on the Hurlford side.

References

External links
Video and commentary on Mossgiel Tunnel, Air Shaft and Tunnel Cottage.

Disused railway stations in East Ayrshire
Railway stations in Great Britain opened in 1848
Railway stations in Great Britain closed in 1965
1848 establishments in Scotland
1965 disestablishments in Scotland
Beeching closures in Scotland
Former Glasgow and South Western Railway stations
Mauchline